Actinopus wallacei is a species of mygalomorph spiders in the family Actinopodidae. It is found in Brazil.

References

wallacei
Spiders described in 1896